is a 2019 Mexican romantic comedy film directed by Ariel Winograd from a screenplay by Cory Brusseau, and Martha Higareda. The film premiered on 20 September 2019, and is stars Higareda, and Omar Chaparro, along to Miriam Higareda,  and Claudia Álvarez. The film is among the first and third place in the top of the highest-grossing film of 2019 in Mexico.
.

Plot 
The story revolves around the story of Adan (Omar Chaparro) and Mia (Martha Higareda), two experts in love conquest strategies, who want to teach their respective friends the rules to win the game of flirting. Adam and Mia meet in a bar and, from there, they will use their techniques to fall in love. This will generate a series of fun entanglements and a power struggle, in which whoever falls in love first loses.

Cast 
 Martha Higareda as Mia
 Omar Chaparro as Adan
 Claudia Álvarez as Margo
 Miriam Higareda as Sam
 Tiaré Scanda as Vera
 Eugenio Siller as Esteban
 Edgar Vivar as Daniel
 Anabel Ferreira as Anabel
 Consuelo Duval as Graciela
 Francisco de la Reguera as Carlos

References

External links 
 

Mexican romantic comedy films
2019 romantic comedy films
2010s Mexican films